Kinga Szemik (born 25 June 1997) is a Polish professional footballer who plays as a goalkeeper for French Division 1 Féminine club Reims and the Poland national team.

Club career
A youth academy graduate of Mitech Żywiec, Szemik made her senior team debut on 17 April 2014 in a 3–1 win against KKP Bydgoszcz. She left the club after 2015–16 Ekstraliga season to continue her studies in United States. She attended University of Texas Rio Grande Valley, where she played for UTRGV Vaqueros from 2016 to 2019.

On 15 May 2020, Szemik signed her first professional contract with Division 2 Féminine club Nantes. On 25 July 2022, she moved to Division 1 Féminine club Reims, by signing a one-year contract.

International career
Szemik was part of Poland under-17 team which won 2013 UEFA Women's Under-17 Championship. She made her senior team debut on 4 October 2018 in a 3–0 win against Estonia.

Career statistics

International

References

External links
 

1997 births
Living people
Women's association football goalkeepers
Polish women's footballers
Poland women's international footballers
Division 1 Féminine players
Division 2 Féminine players
FC Nantes (women) players
Stade de Reims Féminines players
Polish expatriate footballers
Polish expatriate sportspeople in France
Expatriate women's footballers in France